The canton of Grand-Champ is an administrative division of the Morbihan department, northwestern France. Its borders were modified at the French canton reorganisation which came into effect in March 2015. Its seat is in Grand-Champ.

It consists of the following communes:
 
Brandivy
Bréhan
La Chapelle-Neuve
Colpo
Crédin
Évellys
Grand-Champ
Locmaria-Grand-Champ
Locminé
Locqueltas
Moustoir-Ac
Plaudren
Pleugriffet
Plumelin
Radenac
Réguiny
Rohan

References

Cantons of Morbihan